Narkhed taluka is one of the 14 taluka of Nagpur district in state of Maharashtra, India.

Geography

Narkhed taluka has total area of 64491 Hectors. Most of the area of Narkhed taluka are under agricultural land. Some area are hilly and cover with rare forest also.

Wardha river is flowing from western border of taluka. Kar river is flowing from southern border of taluka and Kolar river is flowing from eastern border of taluka. Other river are Jam, Mandakini, Wandali etc.

Mowad and Narkhed has municipal council. Lohari Sawanga, Sawargoan, Jalalkheda, Khairgoan, Belona, Thugoan Deo, Yenikoni, Kharsoli, Bindnoor, Bharsinghi, Tadhipauni, Ambada(t) are major villages in the taluka.

Narkhed is surrounded by Pandhurna taluka towards North, Warud taluka towards west, Saoner taluka towards East, Kalmeshwar taluka South East, Katol taluka towards South, Karanja taluka South west.

Narkhed, Pandhurna, Shendurjana, Warud, Katol, Saoner are the nearby Cities to Narkhed.	

This place is in the border of the Nagpur District and Chhindwara District. Chhindwara District Pandhurna is North towards this place . It is near to the Madhya Pradesh State Border.

Demographics

Culture and Religions
Most of the people in taluka are Hindu. Other than Hindu , Buddhist, Muslim are also living in taluka.
In Hindu most of the people are Teli and Kunbi. Tribal people like Gond  are also in large number.
All the festival like Holi, Diwali, Dasara, Pola, Ganesh Utsav are celebrated in the taluka. There are melas on Holi, Navratri, Shivratri, Pola and many more. Many Varkari used to go Pandharpur on Ashadhi Ekadashi. As well as people of the area also used to visit Chauragarh Mahadev on Nag Panchami and Shivratri.
Other than that Id , Buddha Purnima , Ambedkar Jayanti , Christmas and New Year are also celebrated in the town.

Jalalkheda is famous for it Shivratri mela. Narkhed town is famous for Navratri mela. Belona is famous for Hanuman Temple and mela in Mounth of December.

Climate

Narkhed taluka has a tropical wet and dry climate with hot, dry summers
and mild to cool winters. Summer start from March to June, monsoon
season from July to October and winter from November to March.

Average maximum temperature in summer is in-between 37-46 °C. Average minimum temperature is in-between 9-19 °C.
Average rainfall is in between 110–120 cm.

Administration

Narkhed is the taluka headquarter and Panchayat Samiti. There are 154 villages( 138 villages are inhabited and 16 are villages uninhabited ) under Narkhed taluka and 70 Gram Panchayat. Narkhed is under Katol Vidhan Sabha seat and Ramtek Lok Sabha constituency.

Narkhed and Mowad has a Municipal Council

List of Panchayat Village

Other Villages

Agriculture

Area of Agriculture Land is about 48000 hectors. It is about 74.43% of total area.
Narkhed is very much famous all over the country for it Orange. Once Narkhed was Asia largest Santra Mandi. Other than orange cotton, soyabean are also another major cash crop in Narkhed taluka. Other crop are wheat, jower, rice. In pulses like Tul, Moong and Harbara are also cultivating in the taluka. Because of big demand of vegetables in Nagpur market farmer also growing vegetables throughout the year. Both the session of rabi and kharif has taken in Narkhed.

Irrigation

Agriculture in taluka is mostly depends on rainfall. Other than that farmer used water well, tube well, river, irrigation dam, canal for irrigation. Pimpalgoan Wakhaji is the biggest irrigation dam in Narkhed taluka. Kar dam is covering big area under irrigation through canal. The other irrigation dam are Paradsinga dam, Ambada dam and many more. But still it is on very small level and there are big scope for development in irrigation facilities. River like Wardha, Jam, Mandakini, Wandali, Kolar, and other river are used for irrigation for Rabi crop. But farmers face serious water problems in summer and it has become very difficult to maintain Orange orchards without water.

Transportation

Narkhed taluka is well connected with all the village with taluka headquarter, with all session tar road.
It Connected with State Highway SH245, SH246, SH247, SH248.

Narkhed-Mohadi(D)-Yenwa, Narkhed-Teenkheda-Bhisnoor-Bharsinghi, Jalalkheda-Thadipauni-Ambada, Sawargoan-Mohagoan(b)-Pipla are major district road.
Other than this almost all village are connected by Pradhan Mantri Gram Sadak Yojana.

Narkhed, Jalalkheda, Mowad, Bharshingi, Sawargaon and Lohari Sawanga are major bus stop of MSRTC.

Narkhed taluka is also having good rail connectivity. Narkher Junction railway station is main railway station of the taluka. Other station are Mowad and Tinkheda. Chennai-New Delhi Grand trunk route and Narkhed-Amravati are two railway line passing through taluka.

Narkhed taluka is well connected with Katol, Nagpur, Pandhurna, Warud, Multai, Saoner ard other major town and city of near by area by road and railway.

See also

Narkhed City
Badnera-Narkhed Section

References

Talukas in Maharashtra
Talukas in Nagpur district